Elisabeth Popien is a German alto singer.

A graduate in Protestant church music at the Musikhochschule Köln in 1992, she mainly performs works predating 1800, particularly the Bach cantatas such as Christ lag in Todes Banden, BWV 4, Weinen, Klagen, Sorgen, Zagen, BWV 12 and Actus tragicus, also recitals of Lieder. A member of the vocal ensemble Cantus Cölln, she has worked with Evelyn Tubb, Anthony Rooley, Sigiswald Kuijken, Hermann Max and Jordi Savall.

References

External links
Profile at Cantuscoelln.com 

German contraltos
Living people
German Christians
Year of birth missing (living people)
Place of birth missing (living people)